Stephen Southwold (1887–1964) attended St. Mark's College, Chelsea (1905–07) and worked as a schoolmaster. He served in the Royal Army Medical Corps from 1914 to 1919, then returned to teaching. He became a prolific British writer. Born Stephen Henry Critten, he used a number of pseudonyms, eventually changing his name to one of them, Stephen Southwold. He most often wrote as Neil Bell and also wrote as Miles, Stephen Green, S. H. Lambert, and Paul Martens.

He was born in Southwold, Suffolk. His change of name was apparently a reaction against his father. Initially writing a number of science fiction books, he later concentrated on conventional novels. He also wrote a large number of short stories, many of them under the Southwold name being for children. Bell also wrote several science fiction novels, including The Seventh Bowl (about immortality), The Gas War Of 1940 (about a future war), and the end of the world story The Lord of Life. Who Walk in Fear is a collection of horror stories.

Works

The Common Day (1915) poetry
In Between Stories (1923) as Stephen Southwold
Listen Children: Stories for Spare Moments (1926) as Stephen Southwold
Once Upon a Time Stories (1927) as Stephen Southwold
Ten-Minute Tales (1927) as Stephen Southwold
The Children's Play Hour Book (1927) editor, and sequels
Listen Again Children! (1928) as Stephen Southwold
Happy Families (1929) as Stephen Southwold
Man's Great Adventure (1929) as Stephen Southwold
The Seventh Bowl (1930) as Miles, then Neil Bell
True Tales of an Old Shellback (1930) as Stephen Southwold
Precious Porcelain (1931) as Neil Bell
Valiant Clay (1931) also as The Gas War of 1940, as Miles, then Neil Bell
Life and Andrew Otway (1931) as Neil Bell
The Disturbing Affair of Noel Blake (1932) as Neil Bell
The Marriage Of Simon Harper (1932) as Neil Bell
The Lord of Life (1933) novel, as Neil Bell
Bredon And Sons (1933) as Neil Bell
Fiddlededee: A Medley of Stories (1933) as Stephen Southwold
Death Rocks the Cradle: A Strange Tale (1933) as Paul Martens, then as Neil Bell
The Truth About My Father (1934) as Paul Martens, then as Neil Bell
Winding Road (1934) as Neil Bell
The Days Dividing (1935) as Neil Bell
The Son of Richard Carden (1935) as Neil Bell
Mixed Pickles (1935) stories, as Neil Bell
Animal Stories (1935) as Stephen Southwold
More Animal Stories (1935) as Stephen Southwold
Forty More Tales (1935) as Stephen Southwold
Crocus (1936) as Neil Bell
Lucky Dip (1936) as Neil Bell
Strange Melody (1936) as Neil Bell
The Book of Animal Tales (1936) as Stephen Southwold
The Tales of Joe Egg (1936) as Stephen Southwold
Testament of Stephen Fane (1937) as Neil Bell
Pinkney's Garden (1937)
Precious Porcelain (1938) as Neil Bell
Love And Julian Farne (1938) as Neil Bell
One Came Back (1938) as Neil Bell
The Smallways Rub Along (1938) as Neil Bell
Now For A Story (1938) as Stephen Southwold
Not A Sparrow Falls (1939) as Neil Bell
The Abbot's Heel (1939) as Neil Bell
So Perish The Roses: a novel of the life of Charles Lamb (1940) as Neil Bell
The Desperate Pursuit (1941) as Neil Bell
The Spice of Life (1941) as Neil Bell
Peek's Progress (1942) as Neil Bell
The Tower of Darkness (1942) as Neil Bell
Cover His Face: Thomas Chatterton (1943) as Neil Bell
Child of My Sorrow (1944) as Neil Bell
A Portrait of Gideon Power (1944) as S. H. Lambert, later as Neil Bell
The Handsome Langleys (1945) as Neil Bell
Life Comes to Seathorpe (1946) as Neil Bell
A Romance in Lavender (1946) as Stephen Southwold
Alpha and Omega (1946) stories, as Neil Bell
Forgive Us Our Trespasses (1947) as Neil Bell
The Governess at Ashburton Hall (1948) as Neil Bell
Ten Short Stories (1948)
Immortal Dyer. A Novel of the Life and Times of Jeff Lister, King of the Commons, the Pride of Norfolk (1948) as Stephen Southwold
Who Was James Carey? (1949) as Neil Bell
Scallywag (1949) stories
Forty Stories (1949) as Stephen Southwold
I am Legion (1950) as Neil Bell
Three Pairs of Heels (1950) as Neil Bell
The Inconstant Wife (1950) as Stephen Southwold
The Dark Page (1951) as Neil Bell
One of the Best (1952) as Neil Bell
Life Comes to Seathorpe (1953) as Stephen Southwold
Who Walk in Fear (1953) short novels, as Stephen Southwold
The Secret Life of Miss Lottinger (1953) novella and stories, as Neil Bell
Many Waters (1954) as Neil Bell
Tell Me Another (1954) as Stephen Southwold
My Writing Life (1955) autobiography
The Custody of the Child (1955)
The Flowers of the Forest (1955) as Neil Bell
Luke Bramwhite – His Joyous Life and Happy Death (1955) as Neil Bell
The Captain's Woman: and other Stories (1955) as Neil Bell
All My Days (1956) as Neil Bell
Thy First Begotten (1957) as Neil Bell
What No Woman Knows (1957) as Neil Bell
Mrs Rawleigh and Mrs Paradock (1958) as Neil Bell
The Black Sheep (1958) as Neil Bell
At the Sign of the Unicorn (1959) as Neil Bell
Simon Dale (1959)
Corridor of Venus (1960) as Neil Bell
My Brother Charles (1960) as Neil Bell
13 Piccadilly (1961)) as Neil Bell
The Endless Chain (1961) as Neil Bell
The Narrow Edge (1961) as Neil Bell
Village Casanova and other Stories (1961) as Neil Bell
I Paint Your World (1963) as Neil Bell
The Story of Leon Barentz (1963) as Neil Bell
The Ninth Earl of Whitby (1966) as Neil Bell
Missing from Home (1983) as Neil Bell
The House at the Crossroads
Love and Desire and Hate stories, as Neil Bell
Hey, Diddle Diddle as Stephen Southwold
Ten Old Men as Stephen Southwold
The Last Bus and other stories
The Sea Horses and other stories
Yesterday and Long Ago, as Stephen Southwold

Notes

External links
https://web.archive.org/web/20110610013023/http://homepages.pavilion.co.uk/tartarus/s16.htm
 

1887 births
1964 deaths
English short story writers
English science fiction writers
English horror writers
People from Southwold
English male short story writers
English male novelists
20th-century English novelists
20th-century British short story writers
20th-century English male writers
English male non-fiction writers